Dorothy Smith may refer to:

Dorothy Smith (gymnast) (1919–2005), British Olympic gymnast
Dorothy E. Smith (1926–2022), Canadian sociologist 
Dorothy Smith (Lady Pakington) (died 1639)
Dorothy Garrett Smith (1932–1990), Louisiana politician
Dorothy Hope Smith (1895–1955), artist who drew the Gerber Baby
Dorothy Travers Smith (1901–1977), Irish artist and theatre designer
Dodie Smith (Dorothy Gladys Smith, 1896–1990), English novelist and playwright
Dorothy Greenhough-Smith (1882–1965), British figure skater
Dorothy Smith (1898-1975), British electrical engineer